Chriselle Lim (born 1984/1985) is an American fashion stylist, lifestyle and beauty blogger, digital influencer, and founder of The Chriselle Factor. Born in Texas, she has lived in Seoul. She currently lives in Los Angeles with her daughters. She has also walked down the runway in shows such as Rebecca Minkoff. She has travelled to Europe, Asia, New York, Los Angeles, and Miami for modelling. Having started out as a wardrobe stylist she has generated over 3 million social media followers.

Early life  
Chriselle Lim was born in Texas and spent four of her early years in Seoul, where she was enrolled in a foreign school. Lim stated an early role model of hers was Victoria Beckham.

Lim attended the Fashion Institute of Design & Merchandising from 2004 to 2008, following in her mother's footsteps, who also studied fashion. At the time, Lim intended to be more on the business end of fashion, such as a fashion buyer, instead of being on the creative side.

Career 
She was a stylist and the fashion editor for a local luxury magazine in Beverly Hills before she began blogging.

Lim started her YouTube channel in 2008 after Michelle Phan, an American YouTube personality, introduced her to the digital world.

Lim became a style director for GENLUX in 2011 and is currently the magazine's editor-in-chief. She founded her main website in 2011 as well.

In 2016, Lim appeared in the centennial ad campaign for Keds. The same year, she was part of a panel interviewing Hillary Clinton on Lifetime's show The Conversation.

The Chriselle Factor 
The Chriselle Factor started in 2011 as a passion project to chronicle Lim's latest jobs and projects. After getting a lot of attention on her YouTube channel, Lim turned to the blog for viewer-requested outfit posts. It has since evolved into a fashion, beauty and lifestyle content network. In an interview with AOL, Lim said the brand was built on the word chic, as is her style.

The website is run by a team of 10 members, known as the Cinc Team - Founder and Creative Director is Chriselle Lim herself; Lauren Fong is the president; Laura Arias is the Director of Operations; Idalia Salsamendi is the Director of Business; Jane Park is the editorial director; Hannah Nuñez is a junior editor; Candice Kao on the video team; Timmy Ngo as the videographer; Karla Ticas as creative director; and Drew Scott as the photographer. In 2016, The Chriselle Factor won Bloglovin's Blogger of the Year award.

Arias was the first member of Lim's team and has been with her since 2008. She started as her stylist assistant and has since held different positions for the company.

Personal life 
Lim married Allen Chen on August 8, 2012. They met in 2008 through mutual friends. In 2021, they decided to separate. Lim and Chen have two daughters.

Lim has stated that she edits photos with VSCO and considers Snapchat her "favorite platform".

Her favorite fashion designers are Raf Simons and Marc Jacobs.

References 

Living people
American people of Korean descent
1980s births